Sir Geoffrey John "Geoff" Yeend  (1 May 1927 – 6 October 1994) was a senior Australian public servant. He was Secretary of the Department of the Prime Minister and Cabinet between 1978 and 1986.

Life and career
Geoffrey Yeend was born on 1 May 1927 in Melbourne.

Following his father's footsteps into the Commonwealth Public Service, Geoffrey Yeend began his career in 1945 in the Department of Post-War Reconstruction.

Prime Minister Malcolm Fraser appointed Yeend Secretary of the Department of the Prime Minister and Cabinet in April 1978, after Yeend had been with the Department since 1950.

Yeend left the public service in 1986, following a heart attack. Both in working life as a Commonwealth Public Servant and after his retirement, Yeend was highly committed to community life in Canberra as a golfer, hockey player, board director, charitable contributor and as Chancellor of the Australian National University. He was well-respected and admired by many in the local community.

Yeend died in Sydney on 6 October 1994.

Awards and honours
Yeend was appointed a Commander of the Order of the British Empire in June 1976. He was honoured again in 1979 when he was made a Knight Bachelor.

In January 1986 he was appointed a Companion of the Order of Australia for public service particularly as Secretary of the Department of the Prime Minister and Cabinet and as Secretary to Cabinet.

He was also bestowed with the Order of the Rising Sun, Gold and Silver Star, by the Emperor of Japan for his contribution to promoting economic and cultural relations between Australia and Japan.

In 2012, a street in the Canberra suburb of Casey was named Yeend Avenue in his honour.

References

1927 births
1994 deaths
Australian public servants
Australian Knights Bachelor
Companions of the Order of Australia
Australian Commanders of the Order of the British Empire
Australian National University alumni
Chancellors of the Australian National University
20th-century Australian public servants